Gerani (literally 'Geranium') is a village in the Famagusta District of Cyprus, located  northeast of Trikomo. It is under the de facto control of Northern Cyprus.

References

Communities in Famagusta District
Populated places in İskele District